Makadji Boukar (born January 19, 1984 in Yaoundé) is a professional Cameroonian footballer who most recently played for Al-Zawraa in the Iraqi Premier League.
Boukar previously played for Vasas SC in the Soproni Liga.

Career
Boukar began his career by Cotonsport Garoua and moved 2005 to Sahel FC and in 2008 he returned to his motherclub.

On 2 December 2010, he signed for Hungarian club Nyíregyháza Spartacus.

In February 2012, Boukar joined the Malaysian club, Felda United FC. In April 2012 he was released by the club.

External links
 Makadji Boukar Profile, Statistics - Cotonsport, Cameroon at Allsoccer Players.com
 Makadji Boukar - goalzz.com
 Football : Boukar Makadji - Footballdatabase.eu

1984 births
Living people
Footballers from Yaoundé
Cameroonian footballers
Cameroon international footballers
Coton Sport FC de Garoua players
Sahel FC players
Cameroonian expatriate footballers
Expatriate footballers in Oman
Cameroonian expatriate sportspeople in Oman
Al-Nahda Club (Oman) players
Expatriate footballers in Hungary
Nyíregyháza Spartacus FC players
Cameroonian expatriate sportspeople in Hungary
Vasas SC players
Expatriate footballers in Malaysia
Cameroonian expatriate sportspeople in Malaysia
Felda United F.C. players
Expatriate footballers in Iraq
Cameroonian expatriate sportspeople in Iraq
Al-Quwa Al-Jawiya players
Association football fullbacks
Al-Shorta SC players